"Shot in the Dark" is a song recorded and performed most famously by heavy metal solo artist Ozzy Osbourne. It is the ninth and final track on his 1986 album The Ultimate Sin. A top-ten hit on mainstream rock radio, the song also became his first single to chart on the Billboard Hot 100, peaking at number 68. The official music video for the song was directed by Andy Morahan.

Composition history

"Shot in the Dark" was originally composed sometime around 1983 by members of Wildlife, a band featuring Steve Overland, Chris Overland, Simon Kirke of Bad Company, keyboardist Mark Booty, and future Ozzy Osbourne bassist Phil Soussan.  Wildlife recorded a demo version of the song that was never officially released. When Soussan joined Ozzy Osbourne's band a couple of years later, he and Osbourne then reworked the song for Ozzy Osbourne's recording and release in early 1986. As a result, there has been much debate over the proper authorship of the song.  Although the writing is credited to Soussan and Osbourne, some question whether other members of Wildlife (the Overland brothers, in particular) deserve writing credit for Osbourne's rendition, and what Osbourne's exact role was in the rewriting process.

Later releases and omissions

Despite the commercial success of "Shot in the Dark", it was notably omitted from various re-releases and further compilations after 2000, widely believed to be the result of the aforementioned authorship issues, along with other legal disputes from Phil Soussan and Bob Daisley, while Osbourne himself has simply stated that he hates the Ultimate Sin album in general. One notable exception to the song's consistent exclusion from compilations is the original 1997 release of The Ozzman Cometh. However, the 2002 re-release of this retrospective featured the track "Miracle Man" replacing "Shot in the Dark".  In addition, the song is absent from compilations such as The Essential Ozzy Osbourne, Prince of Darkness, and Memoirs of a Madman.  Both the EP Just Say Ozzy, which contains a live version of the song, and the original studio album The Ultimate Sin, were officially deleted from Ozzy's catalog in 2002.

The original Ozzy Osbourne un-edited studio recording of "Shot in the Dark" (4:26) appears only on the 1986 single and the original release of The Ultimate Sin album. Later reissues of albums featuring a studio version of "Shot in the Dark" (namely, the 1995 remastered edition of The Ultimate Sin and the original 1997 release of The Ozzman Cometh) have the song edited to a 4:16 version, missing four extra measures of music after the first chorus.

The original Wildlife rendition of the song was recorded and released by the Overland brothers' post-Wildlife AOR band FM on their 2012 release Only Foolin EP'''. The song was also covered by Finnish melodic rock band Stala & So. on their 2013 album Play Another Round (as bonus track), by Children of Bodom as a bonus track on their 2000 record Follow the Reaper'', and by German power metal band Powerwolf on their 2015 album Metallum Nostrum.

Track listing

Charts

References

1986 songs
1986 singles
CBS Records singles
Music videos directed by Andy Morahan
Ozzy Osbourne songs
Song recordings produced by Ron Nevison
Songs written by Ozzy Osbourne
Songs written by Phil Soussan